Philip Shane Ardern (born 26 January 1960) is a New Zealand politician. He is a member of the National Party and represented the electorate of Taranaki-King Country from 1998 to 2014.

Early years
Ardern is the son of Noel and Olive Ardern. He was born and raised in Ōpunake, and attended Opunake High School. Before entering politics, he was a dairy farmer, and many of his political activities have been on behalf of the farming community. He is a cousin of former New Zealand Prime Minister and Labour MP Jacinda Ardern.

Member of Parliament

Ardern first became a member of parliament due to the Taranaki-King Country by-election of 1998, which resulted from the retirement from politics of former Prime Minister Jim Bolger. He held that seat from 1998 to 2014.

Ardern became one of the driving forces behind the legislation that enabled the setting up of the dairy company Fonterra in 2001. He came to nationwide attention in late 2003 when he drove a tractor up the front steps of Parliament House as part of a protest against a proposed agricultural emissions research levy, nicknamed the "flatulence" or "fart tax"; the police investigated him for dangerous conduct and charged him with disorderly conduct. From 2008 until his retirement from parliament in 2014 he served as chairman of the parliamentary Primary Production Select Committee. In late 2013 bloggers and media speculatively named Ardern as one of the National Party MPs likely to retire due to a perceived need for rejuvenation of the National Party parliamentary caucus.

Retirement

Ardern announced he was stepping down from his seat in December 2013 and that he would remain an MP until the end of the 50th New Zealand Parliament. Since retiring from Parliament, Ardern has returned to his Central North Island farms, having been succeeded in the Taranki-King Country seat by Barbara Kuriger. Ardern has also begun advocating again at the grassroots  levels for the Taranaki farming communities that supply Fonterra having been noted at several post-election forums held by the dairy industry.

References

External links 
Shane Ardern MP official site
Profile at National party

|-

1960 births
Living people
New Zealand farmers
New Zealand National Party MPs
People from Ōpunake
People educated at Opunake High School
Members of the New Zealand House of Representatives
New Zealand MPs for North Island electorates
21st-century New Zealand politicians